Joseph Schofield (born 1881) was an English footballer. His regular position was as a forward. He was born in Wigan, Lancashire. He played for Manchester United, Brynn Central, Ashton Town, and Stockport County.

External links
MUFCInfo.com profile

1881 births
English footballers
Association football forwards
Manchester United F.C. players
Stockport County F.C. players
Year of death missing
Footballers from Wigan
Ashton Town A.F.C. players